Stanica may refer to:
stanitsa, a Cossack village and unit of rural organization
Stanica, Lower Silesian Voivodeship (south-west Poland)
Stanica, Silesian Voivodeship (south Poland)
 Stanica is also a Romanian name